The Ordnance Survey National Grid reference system (OSGB) (also known as British National Grid (BNG)) is a system of geographic grid references used in Great Britain, distinct from latitude and longitude.

The Ordnance Survey (OS) devised the national grid reference system, and it is heavily used in their survey data, and in maps based on those surveys, whether published by the Ordnance Survey or by commercial map producers. Grid references are also commonly quoted in other publications and data sources, such as guide books and government planning documents.

A number of different systems exist that can provide grid references for locations within the British Isles: this article describes the system created solely for Great Britain and its outlying islands (including the Isle of Man); the Irish grid reference system was a similar system created by the Ordnance Survey of Ireland and the Ordnance Survey of Northern Ireland for the island of Ireland.  The Universal Transverse Mercator coordinate system (UTM) is used to provide grid references for worldwide locations, and this is the system commonly used for the Channel Islands and Ireland (since 2001). European-wide agencies also use UTM when mapping locations, or may use the Military Grid Reference System (MGRS), or variants of it.

Grid letters 
 
The first letter of the British National Grid is derived from a larger set of 25 squares of size 500 km by 500 km, labelled A to Z, omitting one letter (I) (refer diagram below), previously used as a military grid.
For the second letter, each 500 km square is subdivided into 25 squares of size 100 km by 100 km, each with a letter code from A to Z (again omitting I) starting with A in the north-west corner to Z in the south-east corner. These squares are outlined in light grey on the "100km squares" map, with those containing land lettered. The central (2° W) meridian is shown in red.

Grid digits 
Within each square, eastings and northings from the south west corner of the square are given numerically. For example, NH0325 means a 1 km square whose south-west corner is 3 km east and 25 km north from the south-west corner of square NH. A location can be indicated to varying resolutions numerically, usually from two digits in each coordinate (for a 1 km square) through to five (for a 1 m square); in each case the first half of the digits is for the first coordinate and the second half for the other. The most common usage is the six figure grid reference, employing three digits in each coordinate to determine a 100 m square. (Grid references may be written with or without spaces; e.g., also NN166712.) NN has an easting of 200 km and northing of 700 km, so the OSGB36 National Grid location for Ben Nevis is at 216600, 771200.

All-numeric grid references 
Grid references may also be quoted as a pair of numbers: eastings then northings in metres, measured from the southwest corner of the SV square. Note that 14 digits may be required for locations in Orkney and further north.

Another, distinct, form of all-numeric grid reference is an abbreviated alphanumeric reference where the letters are simply omitted, e.g. 166712 for the summit of Ben Nevis.  Unlike the numeric references described above, this abbreviated grid reference is incomplete; it gives the location relative to an OS 100×100 km square, but does not specify which square. It is often used informally when the context identifies the OS 2-letter square.  For example, within the context of a location known to be on OS Landranger sheet 41 (which extends from NN000500 in the south-west to NN400900 in the north-east) the abbreviated grid reference 166712 is equivalent to NN166712.  If working with more than one Landranger sheet, this may also be given as 41/166712.

Alternatively, sometimes numbers instead of the two-letter combinations are used for the 100×100 km squares.  The numbering follows a grid index where the tens denote the progress from West to East and the units from South to North.  In the north of Scotland, the numbering is modified: the 100 km square to the north of 39 is numbered N30; the square to the north of 49 is N40, etc.

Compatibility with related systems 

The grid is based on the OSGB36  datum (Ordnance Survey Great Britain 1936, based on the Airy 1830 ellipsoid), and was introduced after the retriangulation of 1936–1962. It replaced the Cassini Grid which had previously been the standard projection for Ordnance Survey maps.

The Airy ellipsoid is a regional best fit for Britain; more modern mapping tends to use the GRS80 ellipsoid used by the Global Positioning System (the Airy ellipsoid assumes the Earth to be about 1 km smaller in diameter than the GRS80 ellipsoid, and to be slightly less flattened). The British maps adopt a transverse Mercator projection with an origin (the "true" origin) at 49° N, 2° W (an offshore point in the English Channel which lies between the island of Jersey and the French port of St. Malo). Over the Airy ellipsoid a straight line grid, the National Grid, is placed with a new false origin to eliminate negative numbers, creating a 700 km by 1300 km grid. This false origin is located south-west of the Isles of Scilly.

In order to minimize the overall scale error, a factor of 2499/2500 is applied. This creates two lines of longitude about 180 km east and west of the central meridian along which the local scale factor equals 1, i.e. map scale is correct. Inside these lines the local scale factor is less than 1, with a minimum of 0.04% too small at the central meridian. Outside these lines the local scale factor is greater than 1, and is about 0.04% too large near the east and west coasts. Grid north and true north are only aligned on the central meridian (400 km easting) of the grid which is 2° W (OSGB36) and approx.  (WGS 84).

OSGB 36 was also used by Admiralty nautical charts until 2000 after which WGS 84 has been used.

A geodetic transformation between OSGB 36 and other terrestrial reference systems (like ITRF2000, ETRS89, or WGS 84) can become quite tedious if attempted manually. The most common transformation is called the Helmert datum transformation, which results in a typical 7 m error from true. The definitive transformation from ETRS89 that is published by the Ordnance Survey is called the National Grid Transformation OSTN15. This models the detailed distortions in the 1936–1962 retriangulation, and achieves backwards compatibility in grid coordinates to sub-metre accuracy.

Datum shift between OSGB 36 and WGS 84 
The difference between the coordinates on different datums varies from place to place. The longitude and latitude positions on OSGB 36 are the same as for WGS 84 at a point in the Atlantic Ocean well to the west of Great Britain. In Cornwall, the WGS 84 longitude lines are about 70 metres east of their OSGB 36 equivalents, this value rising gradually to about 120 m east on the east coast of East Anglia. The WGS 84 latitude lines are about 70 m south of the OSGB 36 lines in South Cornwall, the difference diminishing to zero in the Scottish Borders, and then increasing to about 50 m north on the north coast of Scotland. (If the lines are further east, then the longitude value of any given point is further west. Similarly, if the lines are further south, the values will give the point a more northerly latitude.) The smallest datum shift is on the west coast of Scotland and the greatest in Kent.

Datum shift between OSGB 36 and ED 50 
These two datums are not both in general use in any one place, but for a point in the English Channel halfway between Dover and Calais, the ED50 longitude lines are about 20 m east of the OSGB36 equivalents, and the ED50 latitude lines are about 150 m south of the OSGB36 ones.

Summary parameters of the coordinate system 
Datum: OSGB36
Map projection: Transverse Mercator projection using Redfearn series
True Origin: 49°N, 2°W
False Origin: 400 km west, 100 km north of True Origin
Scale Factor: 0.9996012717
EPSG Code: EPSG:27700
Ellipsoid: Airy 1830
Semi-major axis a: 
Semi-minor axis b: 
Flattening (derived constant): 1/299.3249646

See also 
 Ordnance Datum Newlyn
 International Map of the World#Map Indexing System
 Irish grid reference system
 Maidenhead Locator System
 United States National Grid
 World Geodetic System

Custom units of measure
 Tetrad
 Hectad
 Myriad

Notes

References

External links 
 Ordnance Survey A guide to coordinate systems in Great Britain: An introduction to mapping coordinate systems and the use of GPS datasets with Ordnance Survey mapping; Version 3.6, 2020 [Retrieved 19 February 2022].
 Ordnance Survey's Grid script: a brief introduction to the National Grid Reference; Version November 2011 [Retrieved 13 February 2014].
 
 
 
 
  - Multiple-format co-ordinate transformer for Great Britain & Channel Islands
 
 
 
 
 
  (JavaScript source code)
 
  Web utility to find a UK grid reference
 LatLong <> OS Grid Ref converts & presents in many formats, generates specific links to that location for several useful map web pages - 1840–present. LatLong WSG84 <> GB, Ireland (inc NI) and Chanel Islands (30U) GR formats recognised. Distance measure for dog-leg routes & area calculations.
  Open source dataset (in GeoPackage format) of the British National Grids at various resolutions, available for download from Ordnance Survey's GitHub.

Geography of the United Kingdom
Maps from Ordnance Survey
Geographic coordinate systems
Land surveying systems
Geodesy
Geocodes